Regnans mays refer to :

 Eucalyptus regnans, a species of Eucalyptus native to southeastern Australia.
 Regnans in Excelsis, a papal bull issued in 1570, declaring Queen Elizabeth I to be a heretic.